Thomas Andrew Malchow (born August 18, 1976) is a retired American competition swimmer, Olympic gold medalist, and former world record-holder.

Malchow represented the United States in three consecutive Summer Olympics.  At the 1996 Summer Olympics in Atlanta, he received a silver medal for his second-place performance in the men's 200-meter butterfly.  Four years later at the 2000 Summer Olympics in Sydney, he won the gold medal in the men's 200-meter butterfly.  He also set a new world record in the 200-meter butterfly in 2000.

Malchow was also a captain of the U.S. Men's Swimming Team at the 2004 Summer Olympics. He attended high school in Minnesota at Saint Thomas Academy, graduated from the University of Michigan and was a member of the United States Swimming (USS) Team 'Star'.

See also
 List of Olympic medalists in swimming (men)
 List of University of Michigan alumni
 List of World Aquatics Championships medalists in swimming (men)
 World record progression 200 metres butterfly

References

External links
 
 
 

1976 births
Living people
American male butterfly swimmers
World record setters in swimming
Michigan Wolverines men's swimmers
Olympic gold medalists for the United States in swimming
Olympic silver medalists for the United States in swimming
Sportspeople from Saint Paul, Minnesota
Swimmers at the 1995 Pan American Games
Swimmers at the 1996 Summer Olympics
Swimmers at the 2000 Summer Olympics
World Aquatics Championships medalists in swimming
Medalists at the 2000 Summer Olympics
Medalists at the 1996 Summer Olympics
Pan American Games silver medalists for the United States
Pan American Games medalists in swimming
Swimmers at the 2004 Summer Olympics
Universiade medalists in swimming
Goodwill Games medalists in swimming
Universiade gold medalists for the United States
Medalists at the 1995 Summer Universiade
Competitors at the 2001 Goodwill Games
Medalists at the 1995 Pan American Games
20th-century American people
21st-century American people